Geert Brusselers (born January 6, 1970 in Eindhoven, Netherlands) is a Dutch football coach and a former player. He manages the Under-19 squad of PSV.

Club career
Geert began his football career with the amateurs of BSC Roosendaal and Valkenswaard. Afterward he transferred to PSV but never managed to break through into the first squad. After his time with PSV, he played for Fortuna Sittard (1989–1991), FC Den Bosch (1991–1992), NAC Breda (1992–1998), Al Nasr (United Arab Emirates; 1998–1999), Germinal Beerschot (Belgium; 1999–2000), Al-Shaab (United Arab Emirates; 2000–2001), Ajax Cape Town (South Africa; 2001–2002), Fortuna Sittard (2002–2004) and the Calgary Mustangs (Canada; 2004).

Personal life
Geert is the father of NAC player Bodi Brusselers and a son of former PSV player Toon Brusselers.

References

External links
Brusselers at VI.nl

1970 births
Living people
Footballers from Eindhoven
Association football midfielders
Dutch footballers
Dutch expatriate footballers
PSV Eindhoven players
Fortuna Sittard players
FC Den Bosch players
NAC Breda players
Al-Nasr SC (Dubai) players
Beerschot A.C. players
Al-Shaab CSC players
Cape Town Spurs F.C. players
Calgary Mustangs (USL) players
Eredivisie players
Eerste Divisie players
Expatriate footballers in the United Arab Emirates
Expatriate footballers in Belgium
Expatriate soccer players in South Africa
Expatriate soccer players in Canada
Dutch expatriate sportspeople in the United Arab Emirates
Dutch expatriate sportspeople in Belgium
Dutch expatriate sportspeople in South Africa
Dutch expatriate sportspeople in Canada
Dutch football managers
UAE Pro League players